BISD is an acronym that may refer to:
Bangladesh International School, Dammam an international Cambridge associate school in Dammam, Saudi Arabia.
Bainbridge Island School District, a school district in Washington
Basic Instruments and Selected Documents, a document series published yearly by the GATT from 1951 until 1995 and afterwards by the WTO
Beaumont Independent School District, as school district in Texas.
Before I Self Destruct, a 2009 album by rapper 50 Cent
Birdville Independent School District, a school district in Texas
Brazosport Independent School District, a school district in Texas
Brownsville Independent School District, a school district in Texas
Bryan Independent School District, a school district in Texas